Honey Redmond (known professionally as Honey Dijon) is an American DJ, producer, and electronic musician. She was born in Chicago and is based in New York City and Berlin.

She has performed at clubs, festivals, art fairs, galleries and fashion events internationally.

Biography 
Honey Dijon grew up in the 1970s on the south side of Chicago, in what she has described as a "very middle-class, loving African-American family” that was very musical. She began clubbing during her mid-teens with her parents' acceptance as long as her academics did not suffer. In the 1990s, she began to perform as a DJ. Around 2000, she also became active as a producer.

During her time in Chicago she met and was mentored by DJs and producers such as Derrick Carter, Mark Farina and Greenskeepers. In the late 1990s, Honey Dijon moved to New York, where she was introduced to Maxi Records and Danny Tenaglia. After first being exposed to techno in Chicago's house scene, she performed on New York City's underground club circuit and played sets at fashion shows.

In 2017 Dijon released her debut album titled The Best of Both Worlds.

Dijon has collaborated with Louis Vuitton and Dior for several years providing soundtracks for their runway presentations.

Dijon was described as a "popular house-music D.J." by the New York Times in 2013. In 2018, Resident Advisor stated that she had popularized "a rambunctious DJ style that leans heavily on golden-era disco, techno and house", while Dijon herself acknowledged that "a lot of people still associate me with swingy Chicago and classic house and disco, but I can rock dirty rhythmic techno as well."

Activism and public image 
Redmond is transgender. She has been a vocal advocate for trans rights and awareness, speaking from her experience as a black trans woman DJ in dance music. In 2016, she was interviewed by the British television channel Channel 4 on the issue of trans visibility. At a 2017 event hosted by the MoMA PS1 museum in New York City, she led a roundtable discussion "focused on those who have, like her, found safety and creative expression within the New York club scene."

Discography

Artist Albums

  The Best of Both Worlds, Classic Records, 2017.
 Black Girl Magic, Defected, 2022.

Compilations
Classic Through the Eyes Of: Honey Dijon, Classic Records, 2013.

Remixes
"Free Woman [Honey Dijon Realness Remix]", Interscope, 2020.

Awards

References

Further reading

External links 

African-American musicians
American women in electronic music
LGBT African Americans
American LGBT musicians
LGBT people from Illinois
Living people
Musicians from Chicago
DJs from Chicago
LGBT DJs
Transgender musicians
Transgender women musicians
Year of birth missing (living people)
African-American women musicians
21st-century African-American people
21st-century African-American women
Electronic dance music DJs